The Frozen Policeman is a 1908 French short silent film by Georges Méliès. No Star Film Company catalogue number is known for it.

The film is rare among Méliès's fiction films in using location shooting of real outdoor landscapes rather than painted scenery. Some of the Méliès family property in Montreuil-sous-Bois can be seen in it, including outside views of Méliès's parents' house and his first glass studio, Studio A.

No English-language release is documented for the film, but the translated title The Frozen Policeman has been used in academic work.

References

External links
 

French black-and-white films
Films directed by Georges Méliès
French silent short films